Artillery Group 22 Garrison ( – Pādegān Gorveh 22 Tūpkhāneh va Manāzel Meskūny) is a villageand military installation in Manzariyeh Rural District, in the Central District of Shahreza County, Isfahan Province, Iran. At the 2006 census, its population was 2,346, in 679 families.

References 

Populated places in Shahreza County
Military installations of the Ground Forces of Islamic Republic of Iran Army